City National Bank Building, also known as the Orpheum Tower, is a 220 ft, 16 story, tower in Downtown Omaha, Nebraska. When built in 1910, it was the tallest building in Omaha. It remained the tallest building until 1912 when the Woodmen of the World was completed. It was added to the NRHP in 1973. The building is now known as the Orpheum Tower and is a 132-unit apartment building.

References

External links
 Orpheum Tower main page
 Orpheum Tower at Emporis.com

Residential skyscrapers in Omaha, Nebraska